Tekkeköy is a place name in Turkish and it may refer to

 Tekkeköy -  a district of Samsun Province
 Tekkeköy, Ayaş - a village in Ayaş district of Ankara Province
 Tekkeköy, Çivril
 Tekkeköy, Elmadağ  -a village in Elmadağ district of Ankara Province
 Tekkeköy, İnegöl
 Tekkeköy, Nallıhan - a village in Nallıhan district of Ankara province
 Tekkeköy, Elmalı - a village in Elmalı district of Antalya Province
 Tekkeköy, Serik - a village in Serik district of Antalya Province
 Tekkeköy, Kastamonu - a village in the central district of Kastamonu Province
 Tekkeköy, Tavas

See also
 Tekkeköyü, Şuhut - a village in Şuhut district of Afyonkarahisar Province